The Miami Marlins' 2023 season will be the 31st season for the Major League Baseball (MLB) franchise in the National League and the 12th as the Miami Marlins. The Marlins play their home games at LoanDepot Park as members of the National League East Division.

Offseason

Rule changes 
Pursuant to the CBA, new rule changes will be in place for the 2023 season:

 institution of a pitch clock between pitches;
 limits on pickoff attempts per plate appearance;
 limits on defensive shifts requiring two infielders to be on either side of second and be within the boundary of the infield; and
 larger bases (increased to 18-inch squares);

Regular season

Game Log

|- style="background:
| 1 || March 30 || Mets || – || || || — || || – ||
|- style="background: 
| 2 || March 31 || Mets || – || || || — || || – ||
|- style="background: 
| 3 || April 1 || Mets || – || || || — || || – ||
|- style="background: 
| 4 || April 2 || Mets || – || || || — || || – ||
|- style="background: 
| 5 || April 3 || Twins || – || || || — || || – ||
|- style="background: 
| 6 || April 4 || Twins || – || || || — || || – ||
|- style="background: 
| 7 || April 5 || Twins || – || || || — || || – ||
|- style="background: 
| 8 || April 6 || @ Mets || – || || || — || || – ||
|- style="background: 
| 9 || April 8 || @ Mets || – || || || — || || – ||
|- style="background: 
| 10 || April 9 || @ Mets || – || || || — || || – ||
|- style="background: 
| 11 || April 10 || @ Phillies || – || || || — || || – ||
|- style="background: 
| 12 || April 11 || @ Phillies || – || || || — || || – ||
|- style="background: 
| 13 || April 12 || @ Phillies || – || || || — || || – ||
|- style="background: 
| 14 || April 14 || Diamondbacks || – || || || — || || – ||
|- style="background: 
| 15 || April 15 || Diamondbacks || – || || || — || || – ||
|- style="background: 
| 16 || April 16 || Diamondbacks || – || || || — || || – ||
|- style="background: 
| 17 || April 17 || Giants || – || || || — || || – ||
|- style="background: 
| 18 || April 18 || Giants || – || || || — || || – ||
|- style="background: 
| 19 || April 19 || Giants || – || || || — || || – ||
|- style="background: 
| 20 || April 21 || @ Guardians || – || || || — || || – ||
|- style="background: 
| 21 || April 22 || @ Guardians || – || || || — || || – ||
|- style="background: 
| 22 || April 23 || @ Guardians || – || || || — || || – ||
|- style="background: 
| 23 || April 24 || @ Braves || – || || || — || || – ||
|- style="background: 
| 24 || April 25 || @ Braves || – || || || — || || – ||
|- style="background: 
| 25 || April 26 || @ Braves || – || || || — || || – ||
|- style="background: 
| 26 || April 27 || @ Braves || – || || || — || || – ||
|- style="background: 
| 27 || April 28 || Cubs || – || || || — || || – ||
|- style="background: 
| 28 || April 29 || Cubs || – || || || — || || – ||
|- style="background: 
| 29 || April 30 || Cubs || – || || || — || || – ||
|- 
 

|- style="background: 
| 30 || May 2 || Braves || – || || || — || || – ||
|- style="background: 
| 31 || May 3 || Braves || – || || || — || || – ||
|- style="background: 
| 32 || May 4 || Braves || – || || || — || || – ||
|- style="background: 
| 33 || May 5 || @ Cubs || – || || || — || || – ||
|- style="background: 
| 34 || May 6 || @ Cubs || – || || || — || || – ||
|- style="background: 
| 35 || May 7 || @ Cubs || – || || || — || || – ||
|- style="background: 
| 36 || May 8 || @ Diamondbacks || – || || || — || || – ||
|- style="background: 
| 37 || May 9 || @ Diamondbacks || – || || || — || || – ||
|- style="background: 
| 38 || May 10 || @ Diamondbacks || – || || || — || || – ||
|- style="background: 
| 39 || May 12 || Reds || – || || || — || || – ||
|- style="background: 
| 40 || May 13 || Reds || – || || || — || || – ||
|- style="background: 
| 41 || May 14 || Reds || – || || || — || || – ||
|- style="background: 
| 42 || May 16 || Nationals || – || || || — || || – ||
|- style="background: 
| 43 || May 17 || Nationals || – || || || — || || – ||
|- style="background: 
| 44 || May 18 || Nationals || – || || || — || || – ||
|- style="background: 
| 45 || May 19 || @ Giants || – || || || — || || – ||
|- style="background: 
| 46 || May 20 || @ Giants || – || || || — || || – ||
|- style="background: 
| 47 || May 21 || @ Giants || – || || || — || || – ||
|- style="background: 
| 48 || May 22 || @ Rockies || – || || || — || || – ||
|- style="background: 
| 49 || May 23 || @ Rockies || – || || || — || || – ||
|- style="background: 
| 50 || May 24 || @ Rockies || – || || || — || || – ||
|- style="background: 
| 51 || May 25 || @ Rockies || – || || || — || || – ||
|- style="background: 
| 52 || May 26 || @ Angels || – || || || — || || – ||
|- style="background: 
| 53 || May 27 || @ Angels || – || || || — || || – ||
|- style="background: 
| 54 || May 28 || @ Angels || – || || || — || || – ||
|- style="background: 
| 55 || May 30 || Padres || – || || || — || || – ||
|- style="background: 
| 56 || May 31 || Padres || – || || || — || || – ||
|- 
 

|- style="background: 
| 57 || June 1 || Padres || – || || || — || || – ||
|- style="background: 
| 58 || June 2 || Athletics || – || || || — || || – ||
|- style="background: 
| 59 || June 3 || Athletics || – || || || — || || – ||
|- style="background: 
| 60 || June 4 || Athletics || – || || || — || || – ||
|- style="background: 
| 61 || June 5 || Royals || – || || || — || || – ||
|- style="background: 
| 62 || June 6 || Royals || – || || || — || || – ||
|- style="background: 
| 63 || June 7 || Royals || – || || || — || || – ||
|- style="background: 
| 64 || June 9 || @ White Sox || – || || || — || || – ||
|- style="background: 
| 65 || June 10 || @ White Sox || – || || || — || || – ||
|- style="background: 
| 66 || June 11 || @ White Sox || – || || || — || || – ||
|- style="background: 
| 67 || June 12 || @ Mariners || – || || || — || || – ||
|- style="background: 
| 68 || June 13 || @ Mariners || – || || || — || || – ||
|- style="background: 
| 69 || June 14 || @ Mariners || – || || || — || || – ||
|- style="background: 
| 70 || June 16 || @ Nationals || – || || || — || || – ||
|- style="background: 
| 71 || June 17 || @ Nationals || – || || || — || || – ||
|- style="background: 
| 72 || June 18 || @ Nationals || – || || || — || || – ||
|- style="background: 
| 73 || June 19 || Blue Jays || – || || || — || || – ||
|- style="background: 
| 74 || June 20 || Blue Jays || – || || || — || || – ||
|- style="background: 
| 75 || June 21 || Blue Jays || – || || || — || || – ||
|- style="background: 
| 76 || June 22 || Pirates || – || || || — || || – ||
|- style="background: 
| 77 || June 23 || Pirates || – || || || — || || – ||
|- style="background: 
| 78 || June 24 || Pirates || – || || || — || || – ||
|- style="background: 
| 79 || June 25 || Pirates || – || || || — || || – ||
|- style="background: 
| 80 || June 27 || @ Red Sox || – || || || — || || – ||
|- style="background: 
| 81 || June 28 || @ Red Sox || – || || || — || || – ||
|- style="background: 
| 82 || June 29 || @ Red Sox || – || || || — || || – ||
|- style="background: 
| 83 || June 30 || @ Braves || – || || || — || || – ||
|- 
 

|- style="background: 
| 84 || July 1 || @ Braves || – || || || — || || – ||
|- style="background: 
| 85 || July 2 || @ Braves || – || || || — || || – ||
|- style="background: 
| 86 || July 3 || Cardinals || – || || || — || || – ||
|- style="background: 
| 87 || July 4 || Cardinals || – || || || — || || – ||
|- style="background: 
| 88 || July 5 || Cardinals || – || || || — || || – ||
|- style="background: 
| 89 || July 6 || Cardinals || – || || || — || || – ||
|- style="background: 
| 90 || July 7 || Phillies || – || || || — || || – ||
|- style="background: 
| 91 || July 8 || Phillies || – || || || — || || – ||
|- style="background: 
| 92 || July 9 || Phillies || – || || || — || || – ||
|- style="background: 
| 93 || July 14 || @ Orioles || – || || || — || || – ||
|- style="background: 
| 94 || July 15 || @ Orioles || – || || || — || || – ||
|- style="background: 
| 95 || July 16 || @ Orioles || – || || || — || || – ||
|- style="background: 
| 96 || July 17 || @ Cardinals || – || || || — || || – ||
|- style="background: 
| 97 || July 18 || @ Cardinals || – || || || — || || – ||
|- style="background: 
| 98 || July 19 || @ Cardinals || – || || || — || || – ||
|- style="background: 
| 99 || July 21 || Rockies || – || || || — || || – ||
|- style="background: 
| 100 || July 22 || Rockies || – || || || — || || – ||
|- style="background: 
| 101 || July 23 || Rockies || – || || || — || || – ||
|- style="background: 
| 102 || July 25 || @ Rays || – || || || — || || – ||
|- style="background: 
| 103 || July 26 || @ Rays || – || || || — || || – ||
|- style="background: 
| 104 || July 28 || Tigers || – || || || — || || – ||
|- style="background: 
| 105 || July 29 || Tigers || – || || || — || || – ||
|- style="background: 
| 106 || July 30 || Tigers || – || || || — || || – ||
|- style="background: 
| 107 || July 31 || Phillies || – || || || — || || – ||
|- 
 

|- style="background: 
| 108 || August 1 || Phillies || – || || || — || || – ||
|- style="background: 
| 109 || August 2 || Phillies || – || || || — || || – ||
|- style="background: 
| 110 || August 3 || Phillies || – || || || — || || – ||
|- style="background: 
| 111 || August 4 || @ Rangers || – || || || — || || – ||
|- style="background: 
| 112 || August 5 || @ Rangers || – || || || — || || – ||
|- style="background: 
| 113 || August 6 || @ Rangers || – || || || — || || – ||
|- style="background: 
| 114 || August 7 || @ Reds || – || || || — || || – ||
|- style="background: 
| 115 || August 8 || @ Reds || – || || || — || || – ||
|- style="background: 
| 116 || August 9 || @ Reds || – || || || — || || – ||
|- style="background: 
| 117 || August 11 || Yankees || – || || || — || || – ||
|- style="background: 
| 118 || August 12 || Yankees || – || || || — || || – ||
|- style="background: 
| 119 || August 13 || Yankees || – || || || — || || – ||
|- style="background: 
| 120 || August 14 || Astros || – || || || — || || – ||
|- style="background: 
| 121 || August 15 || Astros || – || || || — || || – ||
|- style="background: 
| 122 || August 16 || Astros || – || || || — || || – ||
|- style="background: 
| 123 || August 18 || @ Dodgers || – || || || — || || – ||
|- style="background: 
| 124 || August 19 || @ Dodgers || – || || || — || || – ||
|- style="background: 
| 125 || August 20 || @ Dodgers || – || || || — || || – ||
|- style="background: 
| 126 || August 21 || @ Padres || – || || || — || || – ||
|- style="background: 
| 127 || August 22 || @ Padres || – || || || — || || – ||
|- style="background: 
| 128 || August 23 || @ Padres || – || || || — || || – ||
|- style="background: 
| 129 || August 25 || Nationals || – || || || — || || – ||
|- style="background: 
| 130 || August 26 || Nationals || – || || || — || || – ||
|- style="background: 
| 131 || August 27 || Nationals || – || || || — || || – ||
|- style="background: 
| 132 || August 29 || Rays || – || || || — || || – ||
|- style="background: 
| 133 || August 30 || Rays || – || || || — || || – ||
|- style="background: 
| 134 || August 31 || @ Nationals || – || || || — || || – ||
|- 
 

|- style="background: 
| 135 || September 1 || @ Nationals || – || || || — || || – ||
|- style="background: 
| 136 || September 2 || @ Nationals || – || || || — || || – ||
|- style="background: 
| 137 || September 3 || @ Nationals || – || || || — || || – ||
|- style="background: 
| 138 || September 5 || Dodgers || – || || || — || || – ||
|- style="background: 
| 139 || September 6 || Dodgers || – || || || — || || – ||
|- style="background: 
| 140 || September 7 || Dodgers || – || || || — || || – ||
|- style="background: 
| 141 || September 8 || @ Phillies || – || || || — || || – ||
|- style="background: 
| 142 || September 9 || @ Phillies || – || || || — || || – ||
|- style="background: 
| 143 || September 10 || @ Phillies || – || || || — || || – ||
|- style="background: 
| 144 || September 11 || @ Brewers || – || || || — || || – ||
|- style="background: 
| 145 || September 12 || @ Brewers || – || || || — || || – ||
|- style="background: 
| 146 || September 13 || @ Brewers || – || || || — || || – ||
|- style="background: 
| 147 || September 14 || @ Brewers || – || || || — || || – ||
|- style="background: 
| 148 || September 15 || Braves || – || || || — || || – ||
|- style="background: 
| 149 || September 16 || Braves || – || || || — || || – ||
|- style="background: 
| 150 || September 17 || Braves || – || || || — || || – ||
|- style="background: 
| 151 || September 18 || Mets || – || || || — || || – ||
|- style="background: 
| 152 || September 19 || Mets || – || || || — || || – ||
|- style="background: 
| 153 || September 20 || Mets || – || || || — || || – ||
|- style="background: 
| 154 || September 22 || Brewers || – || || || — || || – ||
|- style="background: 
| 155 || September 23 || Brewers || – || || || — || || – ||
|- style="background: 
| 156 || September 24 || Brewers || – || || || — || || – ||
|- style="background: 
| 157 || September 26 || @ Mets || – || || || — || || – ||
|- style="background: 
| 158 || September 27 || @ Mets || – || || || — || || – ||
|- style="background: 
| 159 || September 28 || @ Mets || – || || || — || || – ||
|- style="background: 
| 160 || September 29 || @ Pirates || – || || || — || || – ||
|- style="background: 
| 161 || September 30 || @ Pirates || – || || || — || || – ||
|- style="background: 
| 162 || October 1 || @ Pirates || – || || || — || || – ||
|-

Current roster

Regular season

National League East

National League Wild Card

Farm system

References

External links 
 2023 Miami Marlins season at Baseball Reference

Miami Marlins season
Miami Marlins
Miami Marlins seasons